Brigode is a surname. Notable people with the surname include:

Ace Brigode (1893–1960), American dance band leader
Jane Brigode (1870–1952), Belgian liberal and politician